Women's College, Jharsuguda, is a full-fledged aided College of the Government of Odisha located in Jharsuguda district of Odisha. It was founded on 19 May 1982. This College comes under Sambalpur University. It imparts teaching in Arts, Science and Commerce both in +2 or senior secondary education and +3(three year) Degree Course stage with honours teaching facilities.

The college conducts both undergraduate and graduate programmes in Science, Arts and Commerce.

College
Being a Degree College it is also recognized as a junior college. The Degree college comes under College code-14082404 and The Junior under the College code-14082202.

Junior college and vocational
Along with Women's College other Government college recognized by Odisha Government  in  Jharsuguda (MPL) Block area of Jharsuguda.

Other junior colleges
Other junior Colleges which are present in the Jharsuguda(MPL) Block area include:-

Laxmi Narayan Higher Secondary School, Jharsuguda
Aryabhatt Higher Secondary School, Bijunagar, Bombay Chowk, Jharsuguda
Hemalata Science Higher Secondary School, Sarbahal, Jharsuguda
Black Diamond Higher Secondary School, Jharsuguda
Pradosh Kumar Smruti Smaraki Higher Secondary School, H. Katapali	
Salegram Sakunia Higher Secondary School, Talpatia

Notes

See also
Jharsuguda district
Laxminarayan College, Jharsuguda
Education in India
Literacy in India
List of institutions of higher education in Odisha

References

External links 
 Women's college Official website

Department of Higher Education, Odisha
Universities and colleges in Odisha
Jharsuguda district
Colleges affiliated to Sambalpur University
1982 establishments in Orissa
Educational institutions established in 1982